The 2017 New Jersey General Assembly elections were held on November 7, 2017, to elect members to all 80 seats of the New Jersey General Assembly. Prior to the elections, Democrats held a 52–28 majority in the lower house. Overall, the Democrats increased their majority by 2 to a super-majority at 54–26, due to holding all their seats as well as picking up open seats in District 2 and District 16. This tied Democrats for their largest majority since 1979.

Overall results

Incumbents not seeking re-election

Democratic
 Troy Singleton, District 7 (running for state senate)
 Blonnie R. Watson, District 29
 John Wisniewski, District 19 (running for governor)

Republican
 Chris A. Brown, District 2 (running for state senate)
 Jack Ciattarelli, District 16 (running for governor)
 Declan O'Scanlon, District 13 (running for state senate)
 Gail Phoebus, District 24
 Maria Rodriguez-Gregg, District 8 (withdrew after renomination)
 David C. Russo, District 40

In addition, four members who were elected in the last election in 2015 have since resigned: Patrick J. Diegnan (D-18th), L. Grace Spencer (D-29th), Scott Rumana (R-40th), and Dave Rible (R-30th).

Summary of results by district

Close races 
Districts where the difference of total votes between the top-two parties was under 10%:

 
  
 
 
 
  gain

List of races

Voters in each legislative district elect two members to the New Jersey General Assembly.

Results by district

District 1

Democratic primary
Declared
 Bob Andrzejczak, incumbent assemblyman
 R. Bruce Land, incumbent assemblyman
Results

Republican primary
All three County Republican Parties in the district (Atlantic, Cape May, Cumberland) initially endorsed McDowell and Sauro for the Assembly seats. However, the Cape May and Cumberland parties pulled their endorsements of McDowell after a video surfaced of him propositioning a woman in a bar, with Cumberland endorsing Campbell instead.
Declared
 Robert Campbell, Mayor of Downe
 Brian McDowell, real estate agent and former contestant on The Apprentice
 Jim Sauro, Cumberland County Freeholder and nominee for Assembly in 2015
Results

General election
Polling

Results

District 2

Incumbent Republican Assemblyman Chris A. Brown and incumbent Democratic Assemblyman Vince Mazzeo both declared runs for Senate to replace the retiring Jim Whelan. Mazzeo later dropped out of the Senate race on March 15 and instead ran for re-election.

Republican primary
Declared
 Vince Sera, Brigantine City Councilman
 Brenda Taube, former Margate City Commissioner
Results

Democratic primary
Declared
 John Armato, Buena Vista Township Committeeman
 Jim Carney, former Atlantic County Surrogate
 Ernest Coursey, Atlantic County Freeholder
 Rizwan Malik, former Atlantic City Councilman
 Vince Mazzeo, incumbent assemblyman
 Theresa "Birdie" Watts, attorney
Withdrawn
 Colin Bell, former Atlantic County Freeholder and nominee for Assembly in 2015 (running for State Senate)
 Barbara Rheault, former Mullica Township Committeewoman (did not submit petitions)
Results

Independents and third parties
Declared
 Heather Gordon (Independent), small business owner and author
 Mico Lucide (Green), community activist and organizer

General election
Polling

Results

|- style="background-color:#F6F6F6" 
! style="background-color: #3333FF" | 
| colspan="6" | One Democratic gain from Republican
|-

District 3

Democratic primary
Declared
 John J. Burzichelli, incumbent assemblyman
 John Kalnas, independent candidate for Assembly in 2015
 Adam Taliaferro,  incumbent assemblyman
Results

Republican primary
Declared
 Linwood Donelson, Salem County Vocational Technical Schools board member
 Philip Donohue, former teacher
Results

Independents and third parties
Declared
 Edward Durr (Independent)

General election
Results

District 4

Democratic primary
Declared
 Paul D. Moriarty, incumbent assemblyman
 Gabriela Mosquera, incumbent assemblywoman
Results

Republican primary
Declared
 Patricia Jefferson Kline
 Eduardo J. Maldonado
Results

Independents and third parties
Declared
 William McCauley Jr. (Independent)

General election
Results

District 5

Democratic primary
Declared
 Arthur Barclay, incumbent assemblyman
 Patricia Egan Jones, incumbent assemblywoman
Results

Republican primary
Declared
 Kevin Ehret, nominee for Assembly in 2015
 Teresa L. Gordon
Results

General election
Results

District 6

Democratic primary
Declared
 Frederick Dande
 Louis Greenwald, incumbent assemblyman
 Pamela Rosen Lampitt, incumbent assemblywoman
Results

Republican primary
Declared
 Winston Extavour
 David C. Moy
Results

Independents and third parties
Declared
 Monica Sohler (American Solidarity Party)

General election
Results

District 7

Incumbent Democratic Assemblyman Troy Singleton ran for the district's open Senate seat. Fellow incumbent Democrat Herb Conaway contemplated a run for Senate as well, but decided to run for re-election.

Democratic primary
Declared
 Jennifer Chuang, pediatrician
 Herb Conaway, incumbent assemblyman
 Carol A. Murphy, director of Policy and Communication for Assemblywoman Gabriela Mosquera
Results

Republican primary
Declared
 Mike Piper
 Octavia Scott
Declined
 Dana Dewedoff, Young Republican and nonprofit president
Results

Piper was replaced on the ballot for the general election by Beverly Common Councilman Bob Thibault, as selected by local Republican committee members on September 6.

General election
Results

District 8

Republican primary
Declared
 Joe Howarth, incumbent assemblyman
 Maria Rodriguez-Gregg, incumbent assemblywoman
Results

Following the primary, Rodriguez-Gregg announced she was dropping out of the race on August 30. Burlington County Freeholder Ryan Peters was named as a replacement candidate, selected by local Republican committee members on September 6 over Lumberton Mayor Sean Earlen, Burlington County Freeholder Kate Gibbs, and Westampton Deputy Mayor Abe Lopez.

Democratic primary
Declared
 Maryann Merlino
 Joanne Schwartz, former Burlington County Freeholder
Results

Independents and third parties
Declared
 Ryan T. Calhoun (Independent)

General election
Results

District 9

Republican primary
Declared
 DiAnne Gove, incumbent assemblywoman
 Brian E. Rumpf, incumbent assemblyman
Results

Democratic primary
Declared
 Jill Dobrowansky, teacher and school administrator
 Ryan Young, communications expert and army veteran
Results

General election
Results

District 10

Republican primary
Declared
 Gregory P. McGuckin, incumbent assemblyman
 David W. Wolfe, incumbent assemblyman
Results

Democratic primary
Declared
 Raymond Baker, retired pharmacist
 Michael Cooke, attorney and nominee for Ocean County Freeholder in 2016
Results

General election
Results

District 11

Democratic primary
Declared
 Joann Downey, incumbent assemblywoman
 Eric Houghtaling, incumbent assemblyman
Withdrawn
 Aasim Johnson, Rider University student and candidate for Lakewood school board in 2014
Results

Republican primary
Declared
 Robert Acerra, deputy mayor of Ocean Township (Monmouth)
 Mike Whelan, Red Bank Borough Councilman
Results

General election
Results

District 12

Republican primary
Declared
 Robert D. Clifton, incumbent assemblyman
 Ronald S. Dancer, incumbent assemblyman
 Alex Robotin, former Chesterfield Township Committeeman
 John Franklin Sheard
 Eleanor "Debbie" Walker, Old Bridge Township Councilwoman
Results

Democratic primary
Declared
 Gene Davis, former Linden City Councilman
 Nirav Patel, pharmacist
Results

Independents and third parties
Declared
 Daniel A. Krause (Libertarian)
 Anthony J. Storrow (Libertarian)

General election
Results

District 13

Incumbent Republican Assembly members Declan O'Scanlon and Amy Handlin both declared for the district's open Senate seat. Handlin dropped out on March 2 and chose to seek re-election instead after being outraised by O'Scanlon.

Republican primary
Declared
 Serena DiMaso, Monmouth County Freeholder
 Amy Handlin, incumbent assemblywoman
Withdrawn
 Bob Marchese, Fair Haven Borough Councilman
 Gerry Scharfenberger, Mayor of Middletown
Results

Democratic primary
Declared
 Mariel DiDato, activist
 Thomas Giaimo, attorney
Results

Independents and third parties
Declared
 Eveline H. Brownstein (Libertarian)

General election
Results

District 14

Democratic primary
Declared
 Daniel R. Benson, incumbent assemblyman
 Wayne DeAngelo, incumbent assemblyman
Results

Republican primary
Declared
 Kristian Stout, policy analyst and Rutgers University lecturer
 Steven Uccio, nominee for Congress in NJ-12 in 2016 and Libertarian nominee for Assembly in 2013
Results

General election
Results

District 15

Democratic primary
Declared
 Gail Boyle Boyland
 Reed Gusciora, incumbent assemblyman
 Elizabeth Maher Muoio, incumbent assemblywoman
Results

Republican primary
Declared
 Emily Rich
 Rimma Yakobovich
Results

General election
Results

District 16

Incumbent Republican Assemblyman Jack Ciattarelli announced a run for governor on October 3, 2016.

Republican primary
Declared
 Mark Caliguire, Somerset County Freeholder
 Donna Simon, former assemblywoman
Results

Democratic primary
Declared
 Roy Freiman, former Prudential executive
 Andrew Zwicker, incumbent assemblyman
Declined
 Andrew Koontz, Mercer County Freeholder
 Liz Lempert, Mayor of Princeton
Results

General election
Results

|- style="background-color:#F6F6F6" 
! style="background-color: #3333FF" | 
| colspan="6" | One Democratic gain from Republican
|-

District 17

Democratic primary
Declared
 Joseph Danielsen, incumbent assemblyman
 Joseph V. Egan, incumbent assemblyman
 Heather Fenyk, nonprofit director
 Ralph E. Johnson, law enforcement official
Results

Republican primary
Declared
 Robert Quinn, operations director for a data center and disaster recovery firm
 Nadine Wilkins, businesswoman and former special education teacher
Results

Independents and third parties
Declared
 Michael Habib (Independent)

General election
Results

District 18

Democratic primary
Declared
 Robert Karabinchak, incumbent assemblyman
 Nancy Pinkin, incumbent assemblywoman
Results

Republican primary
Declared
 April Bengivenga
 Lewis Glogower
Withdrawn
 Bryan Li
Results

Following the primary, Glogower was selected as a replacement nominee for the Senate seat. Zhiyu "Jimmy" Hu replaced Glogower on the Assembly ballot for the general election.

Independents and third parties
Declared
 Sean Stratton (Green), consultant

General election
Results

District 19

Incumbent Democratic Assemblyman John Wisniewski announced a run for governor on November 15, 2016.

Democratic primary
Declared
 Craig Coughlin, incumbent assemblyman
 Yvonne Lopez, executive director of the Puerto Rican Association for Human Development
Results

Republican primary
Declared
 Deepak Malhotra, certified public accountant
 Amarjit K. Riar
Results

Independents and third parties
Declared
 William Cruz (Independent)

General election
Results

District 20

Democratic primary
Declared
 Jamel Holley, incumbent assemblyman
 Annette Quijano, incumbent assemblywoman
Withdrawn
 Ieesha Turnage
Results

Republican primary
With the removal of Michael Barrett from the ballot, there was only one Republican filed for the two seats in this district.
Declared
 Joseph G. Aubourg
Withdrawn
 Michael Barrett
Results

General election
Results

District 21

Republican primary
Declared
 Jon Bramnick, incumbent assemblyman
 Nancy Munoz, incumbent assemblywoman
Results

Democratic primary
Declared
 David Barnett, former mayor of Springfield Township (Union) and nominee for Assembly in 2015
 Lacey Rzeszowski, activist
Results

Following the primary, Barnett dropped out, citing work commitments. Bruce Bergen, Union County Freeholder Chairman and nominee for Assembly in 2005, 2007, 2009, and 2011, was selected by local Democratic committee members as a replacement candidate on August 14.

General election
Results

District 22

Democratic primary
Declared
 Paul M. Alirangues
 Jerry Green, incumbent assemblyman
 James J. Kennedy, incumbent assemblyman
Results

Republican primary
Declared
 Richard S. Fortunato
 John Quattrocchi
Results

Independents and third parties
Declared
 Onel Martinez (Independent), Kean University student
 Sumantha Prasad (Independent)

General election
Results

District 23

Republican primary
Declared
 John DiMaio, incumbent assemblyman
 Erik Peterson, incumbent assemblyman
Results

Democratic primary
Declared
 Isaac Hadzovic
 Laura Shaw
Results

Following the primary, Hadzovic was ruled ineligible to run in the district due to residency requirements. Charles Boddy was selected as a replacement candidate.

Independents and third parties
Declared
 Michael Estrada (Independent)
 Tyler J. Gran (Independent)

General election
Results

District 24

In February, incumbent Republican Assemblywoman Gail Phoebus declined to run for a second term and announced a primary challenge to Steve Oroho, reportedly due to disagreements with Oroho over an increase to the gas tax. On March 28, Phoebus dropped her challenge and announced that she would not run for re-election either.

Republican primary
Declared
 David Atwood
 Nathan Orr, candidate for Assembly in 2015
 Parker Space, incumbent assemblyman
 Harold J. Wirths, former Commissioner of the New Jersey Department of Labor and Workforce Development
Withdrawn
 Mark Quick, former U.S. Marine and independent candidate for Congress in NJ-5 in 2010 and 2014 (petitions rejected)
 David Scapicchio, former Morris County Freeholder (running for Freeholder)
Results

Democratic primary
Declared
 Kate Matteson, paralegal
 Michael Thomas Pirog
 Gina Trish, adjunct professor at Centenary University, design professional, and nominee for Blairstown Township Committee in 2012
Withdrawn
 Sean Clarkin, real estate agent
Results

Independents and third parties
Declared
 Kenneth Collins (Green)
 Collins announced on June 3 that he was dropping out of the race.  However, his name still remained on the ballot.
 Aaron Hyndman (Green), co-chair of the Green Party of New Jersey
Declined
 Mark Quick (Independent), former U.S. Marine and independent candidate for Congress in NJ-5 in 2010 and 2014

General election
Results

District 25

Republican primary
Declared
 Tony Bucco, incumbent assemblyman
 Michael Patrick Carroll, incumbent assemblyman
Results

Democratic primary
Declared
 Richard Corcoran, forensic accountant and nominee for Assembly in 2015
 Tom Moran, retired IT professional and nominee for Assembly in 2015
Results

General election
Results

District 26

Republican primary
Declared
 John Cesaro, Morris County Deputy Freeholder Director
 BettyLou DeCroce, incumbent assemblywoman
 Hank Lyon, Morris County Freeholder
 Jay Webber, incumbent assemblyman
Results

Democratic primary
Declared
 William Edge, former Verona and Caldwell Councilman
 Laura Fortgang, life coach and author
 Joseph Raich, limousine driver and nominee for Assembly in 2001, 2011, 2012, and 2013
Results

General election
Results

District 27

Democratic primary
Declared
 Mila Jasey, incumbent assemblywoman
 John F. McKeon, incumbent assemblyman
Results

Republican primary
Declared
 Ronald DeRose, member of the Florham Park Zoning Board of Adjustment
 Angelo Tedesco Jr., former East Hanover Township Councilman
Results

General election
Results

District 28

Democratic primary
Declared
 Ralph R. Caputo, incumbent assemblyman
 Cleopatra Tucker, incumbent assemblywoman
Results

Republican primary
Declared
 James Boydston
 Veronica Branch
Results

Independents and third parties
Declared
 Joanne Miller (Independent)
 Scott Thomas Nicastro Jr. (Independent)

General election
Results

District 29

Incumbent Democratic Assemblywoman Blonnie R. Watson did not run for a full term.

Democratic primary
Declared
 Eliana Pintor Marin, incumbent assemblywoman
 Shanique Speight, Essex County Sheriff's officer and former Newark school board member
Withdrawn
 Tai Cooper, policy advisor to Newark Mayor Ras J. Baraka
 Pat Council, Newark Director of Recreation, Cultural Affairs, and Senior Services
 Safanya Searcy, labor organizer and party strategist
Results

Republican primary
Declared
 Charles G. Hood
 Jeanette Veras, nominee for Assembly in 2015
Results

General election
Results

District 30

Republican primary
Declared
 Sean T. Kean, incumbent assemblyman
 Dave Rible, incumbent assemblyman
Results

Following the primary, Rible was nominated director of the New Jersey Division of Alcoholic Beverage Control by Governor Chris Christie. Rible resigned his Assembly seat on July 17 to accept the position. A special convention was held on August 15, where local Republican committee members selected a candidate to serve the remaining months of Rible's term in addition to replacing him on the ballot. Three Republicans were running: former Belmar Borough Councilman James Bean, chairman of the Lakewood Republican Party Justin Flancbaum, and former mayor of Wall Ned Thomson. Wall school board member Ralph Addonizio and Monmouth County Freeholder Gary Rich also declared runs but later dropped out. Thomson was selected as the replacement, receiving 83 votes to Flancbaum's 53 and Bean's 18, and was sworn into the Assembly on August 24.

Democratic primary
Declared
 Eliot Colon, businessman
 Kevin Scott, manager of a Chipotle restaurant
Results

General election
Results

District 31

Democratic primary
Declared
 Nicholas Chiaravalloti, incumbent assemblyman
 Angela V. McKnight, incumbent assemblywoman
 Christopher Munoz, Bayonne school board trustee
 Kristen Zadroga-Hart, high school teacher
Results

Republican primary
Marie Tauro, a commissioner of the Jersey City Municipal Utilities Authority and vice chair of the Jersey City Tea Party Alliance, was planning on running, but was killed in a hit-and-run on April 2, the night before the filing deadline.
Declared
 Michael J. Alonso
 Lauren DiGiaro
Withdrawn
 Neil A. Schulman
 Sonia N. Schulman
Results

General election
Results

District 32

Democratic primary
Declared
 Angelica M. Jimenez, incumbent assemblywoman
 Vincent Prieto, incumbent assemblyman
Results

Republican primary
Declared
 Ann M. Corletta
 Bartholomew J. Talamini
Results

General election
Results

District 33

Democratic primary
Declared
 Annette Chaparro, incumbent assemblywoman
 Raj Mukherji, incumbent assemblyman
Results

Republican primary
Declared
 Francisco Aguilar
 Holly Lucyk
Results

Following the primary, Aguilar dropped out of the race on September 13.

General election
Results

District 34

Democratic primary
Declared
 Thomas P. Giblin, incumbent assemblyman
 Sheila Oliver, incumbent assemblywoman
Results

Following the primary, Oliver was selected by Democratic gubernatorial nominee Phil Murphy to be his nominee for Lieutenant Governor on July 26. Despite state law prohibiting accepting nominations for more than one office in the same election, Oliver still ran for re-election, with party officials claiming a loophole in the law with her being selected as a running mate instead of being nominated as a candidate in a primary.

Republican primary
Declared
 Ghalib Mahmoud
 Nicholas G. Surgent
Results

Mahmoud was replaced on the ballot for the general election by Tafari Anderson.

General election
Results

District 35

Democratic primary
Declared
 Shavonda E. Sumter, incumbent assemblywoman
 Benjie E. Wimberly, incumbent assemblyman
Results

Republican primary
Declared
 Ibrahim Mahmoud
 Nihad Younes
Results

General election
Results

District 36

Democratic primary
Declared
 Marlene Caride, incumbent assemblywoman
 Gary Schaer, incumbent assemblyman
Results

Republican primary
Declared
 Marc Marsi
 Paul Passamano, former Lyndhurst Commissioner
Results

General election
Results

District 37

Democratic primary
Declared
 Valerie Huttle, incumbent assemblywoman
 Gordon M. Johnson, incumbent assemblyman
Results

Republican primary
Declared
 Margaret Ahn, loan expert and nominee for Fort Lee Borough Council in 2015
 Paul A. Duggan
 Angela Hendricks
 Gino P. Tessaro
Results

Independents and third parties
Declared
 Claudio I. Belusic (Libertarian)

General election
Results

District 38

Democratic primary
Declared
 Tim Eustace, incumbent assemblyman
 Joseph Lagana, incumbent assemblyman
Results

Republican primary
Declared
 Matthew Seymour, attorney and nominee for New Milford Borough Council in 2015
 Christopher Wolf, pastor and radio show host
Declined
 John Cosgrove, Mayor of Fair Lawn
Results

Following the primary on July 1, Seymour dropped out, switched party registration, and endorsed the Democratic slate, citing policy differences with the party in regards to domestic violence victims assistance. Former Hasbrouck Heights Borough Councilman Dave Gonzalez and Glen Rock Borough Councilman Bill Leonard declared intentions to run as a replacement, with Gonzalez later dropping out to back Leonard.

Independents and third parties
Declared
 Dev Goswami (Independent), policy analyst

General election
Results

District 39

Republican primary
Declared
 Robert Auth, incumbent assemblyman
 Holly Schepisi, incumbent assemblywoman
Results

Democratic primary
Declared
 Jannie Chung, Closter Borough Councilwoman
 Annie Hausmann
Results

General election
Results

District 40

Incumbent Republican Assemblyman David C. Russo, the longest serving current member of the Assembly, did not run for re-election.

Republican primary
Declared
 Joseph Bubba Jr., son of former State Senator Joseph Bubba
 Christopher DePhillips, former mayor of Wyckoff
 Norman M. Robertson, former state senator (District 34)
 Kevin J. Rooney, incumbent assemblyman
Results

Democratic primary
Declared
 Christine Ordway, nominee for Assembly in 2015
 Paul Vagianos, restaurant owner and nominee for Assembly in 2015
Withdrawn
 Andrea L. Brown
Results

Independents and third parties
Declared
 Anthony J. Pellechia (Independent)

General election
Polling

Results

References

General Assembly
New Jersey
New Jersey General Assembly elections